The Grossinger Open was a golf tournament on the LPGA Tour, played only in 1960. It was played at the Grossinger Resort in Liberty, New York. Mickey Wright won the event.

References

Former LPGA Tour events
Golf in New York (state)
History of women in New York (state)
1960 in New York (state)